Metamorphosis is an adventure video game with platforming elements, inspired by the imagination of Franz Kafka. The game was developed by Ovid Works and published by All in! Games on August 12, 2020. Metamorphosis is available on PC (Steam and GOG), PS4, Xbox One, and Nintendo Switch.

Gameplay 
The player takes the role of Gregor, a man turned into a tiny insect. The aim is to solve the mystery of the transformation, regain human form, and save Gregor's friend, Joseph, who was arrested for unknown reasons. The player discovers a surreal world from the first-person perspective, solves logical and platform puzzles. The insect form allows for such mechanics as climbing vertical surfaces.

Development and release 
Before release, the game received several awards, including Indie Showcase Finalist Digital Dragons 2018, Indie Prize Finalist, and Nordic Game Discovery Finalist.

Metamorphosis was warmly received. Screen Rant marked the game 3 / 5 and on Metacritic it gained 69/100 points.

References

External links 

 Official website

2020 video games
First-person video games
Nintendo Switch games
Xbox One games
PlayStation 4 games
Microsoft Windows
Video games developed in Poland
Adventure games
Platform games
Video games about insects
Video games based on novels
All in! Games games